A megalopolis or a supercity, also called a megaregion, is a group of metropolitan areas which are perceived as a continuous urban area through common systems of transport, economy, resources, ecology, and so on. They are integrated enough that coordinating policy is valuable, although the constituent metropolises keep their individual identities. The megalopolis concept has become highly influential as it introduced a new, larger scale thinking about urban patterns and growth.

Etymology and earlier definitions
The Online Etymology Dictionary notes that the term was also used "in classical times as an epithet of great cities (Athens, Syracuse, Alexandria)".

The term has specific geographic definitions dating from 1832, when its meaning was "a metropolis," that is, "a very large, heavily populated urban complex".

In the late 1950s and early 1960s, Jean Gottmann, a professor of political science at the University of Paris and member of the Institute for Advanced Study at Princeton, directed "A Study of Megalopolis" for The Twentieth Century Fund, wherein he described a megalopolis as a "world of ideas". Gottmann, in his extensive studies, applied the term megalopolis to an analysis of the urbanized northeastern seaboard of the U.S., in particular from Boston, Massachusetts to Washington, D.C. (now commonly referred to as the Northeast Corridor). He chose the term megalopolis in consultation with classicists, noting earlier usage "with quite different meaning" (besides by the ancients, by Lewis Mumford with regard to the general trend in history and geography "toward large cities"). [Mumford, in his The Culture of Cities (1938), describes their formation as the first stage in urban overdevelopment and social decline.] In 1994, William S. Ellis and the editors of the National Geographic, writing about the city of Boston, asserted that Gottmann's c.1961 use of the term for the Northeast megalopolis was the first specific use of the term with the refined meaning of an amalgam of multiple urban areas into a larger area. Yoav Hagler, writing in 2009 for the America 2050 project of the Regional Plan Association (RPA) likewise, in introducing the term historically, states megalopolis as the antecedent of the RPA's preferred term for U.S. examples, which is "megaregion" Pedagogically, the term "supercity" has been offered as a synonym for these two terms.

According to Syracuse University assistant professor of architecture Lydia Kallipoliti (and her students, citing Volker Welter's Biopolis: Patrick Geddes and the City of Life), the first modern use of the term megalopolis was by Patrick Geddes in his 1915 book, Cities in Evolution, and that it was then used by Oswald Spengler in his 1918 book The Decline of the West.

Modern definitions

A megalopolis and its synonym megaregion, following the work of Gottmann, refer to two or more roughly adjacent metropolitan areas that, through commonality of systems—e.g., of transport, economy, resources, and ecologies—experience a blurring of the boundaries between the population centers, such that while some degree of separation may remain, their perception as a continuous urban area is of value, e.g., "to coordinate policy at this expanded scale". Simply put, a megalopolis (or a megaregion) is a clustered network of big cities. Gottmann defined its population as 25 million, while Doxiadis defined a small megalopolis a similar cluster with a population of about 10 million. America 2050, a program of the Regional Plan Association (RPA), lists 11 megaregions in the United States and Canada.

Megaregions of the United States were explored in a July 2005 report by Robert E. Lang and Dawn Dhavale of the Metropolitan Institute at Virginia Tech. A later 2007 article by Lang and Nelson uses 20 "megapolitan" areas grouped into 10 megaregions. The concept is based on the original "Megalopolis model".

Modern interlinked ground transportation corridors, such as rail and highway, often aid in the development of megalopolises. Using these commuter passageways to travel throughout the megalopolis is informally called megaloping, a term coined by Davide Gadren and Stefan Berteau.

In Brazil, the term  has a legal meaning, different from the English word megaregion: mesoregions of Brazil and microregions of Brazil. In China, the official term corresponding to the meaning of "megalopolis" is '', which literally means "city cluster". City cluster '' is defined as "[a]n area in which cities are relatively densely distributed in a certain region". Until 2019, and the publication of National Development and Reform Commission (NDRC) guidelines, there was no clear distinction between "megalopolis" and "metropolitan area" in China.

Africa

Egypt
 Greater Cairo: The Governorates of Cairo, Giza, Qalyubiyya and Helwan have a population of over 16 million. The area around the Nile is also very densely populated.
 Nile Delta: The Governorates of Alexandria, Beheira, Kafr el-Sheikh, Gharbia, Monufia, Qalyubiyya, Dakahlia, Damietta, Al Sharqia, and Port Said have a population of over 41 million.

South Africa
 Gauteng Province: The cities of Pretoria, Witwatersrand and Vereeniging includes the urbanised portion of Pretoria, Centurion, Midrand, Johannesburg and the Vaal Triangle, with a population of over 14 million.

Morocco
 The region of El Jadida-Casablanca-Rabat-Salé-Kenitra, concentrating in a long coastal belt, has a population of more than 11 million.

Kenya
 Nairobi Metropolitan Region: The counties of Kajiado, Kiambu, Nairobi, Machakos and Murang'a, have a population of 8 million.

Asia

East Asia

China

In July 2012, the Economist Intelligence Unit brought out a report that described 13 emerging megalopolises in China, highlighting the demographic and income trends that are shaping their development. Eleven Chinese megalopolises (not necessarily drawn from the preceding source), are:

Pearl River Delta Megalopolis a.k.a. Guangdong–Hong Kong–Macao Greater Bay Area: Hong Kong, Shenzhen, Dongguan, Guangzhou, Foshan, Jiangmen, Zhongshan, Zhuhai, Macau, Huizhou (55,000,000). Pan-Pearl River Delta further includes provinces adjacent to Guangdong.
Yangtze Delta Megalopolis: Shanghai, Nanjing, Hangzhou, Ningbo, Suzhou, Jingjiang, Wuxi, Changzhou, Zhenjiang, Yangzhou, Taizhou, Nantong, Huzhou, Jiaxing, Shaoxing, Jiangyin, Haimen, Zhangjiagang, Zhoushan, Ma'anshan (88,000,000).
 Bohai Economic Rim: Beijing, Shenyang, Tianjin, Dalian, Anshan, Fushun, Dandong, Sinuiju, Tangshan, Yantai, Jinan, Qinhuangdao, Qingdao, Weihai (66,400,000)
Western Taiwan Straits Economic Zone: Xiamen, Fuzhou, Wenzhou, Shantou, Jieyang, Chaozhou (25,000,000).
Central Plain: Kaifeng, Xinxiang, Zhengzhou, Luoyang (14,170,000).
Central-Southern Liaoning: Within 150 km from its center Shenyang (7.2 million), it has Fushun (3 million), Anshan (3.6 million), Benxi (1.5 million), Liaoyang (1.8 million), Yingkou (2.2 million), Panjin (1.2 million), and Tieling (3.4 million), with a total population of 23 million. And it can be further extended to Dalian (6.2 million), Fuxin (2 million) and Dandong (2.4 million). This area used to be the most industrialized region in China, but began to decline in the 1980s.
Harbin-Changchun Megalopolis, also referred to as the Northeastern Cities: Harbin, Qiqihar, Daqing, Changchun, Jilin City, Siping including Rason in North Korea and Vladivostok in Russia (21,832,000).
Sichuan Basin a.k.a. Chengyu Megalopolis: Chengdu, Chongqing, Mianyang, Deyang, Leshan, Meishan, Ziyang, Zigong, Luzhou.
Greater Wuhan Megalopolis (大武汉都市圈): Wuhan, Huangshi, Xinyang, Jiujiang, Yueyang (20,000,000).
Guanzhong (关中): Xi'an, Xianyang, Baoji, Weinan (16,722,000).
Changzhutan Megalopolis a.k.a. Greater Changsha Metropolitan Region: Changsha, Zhuzhou, Xiangtan (12,994,400 in 2000).

Japan

Japan is made up of overlapping megapolises. The Taiheiyō Belt megapolis itself includes both the Greater Tokyo Area and Keihanshin megapoles.

 Taiheiyō Belt – Ibaraki, Saitama, Chiba, Tokyo, Kanagawa, Shizuoka, Aichi, Gifu, Mie, Kyoto, Osaka, Hyōgo, Wakayama, Okayama, Hiroshima, Yamaguchi, Fukuoka, and Ōita in Japan. (81,859,345)
 Greater Tokyo Area - Part of the larger Kantō region, broadly including Tokyo and Yokohama, Japan's two most populous cities. (38,000,000)
 Keihanshin - Part of the larger Kansai region, includes Osaka, Kyoto, Kobe. (19,341,976)

South Korea
 Seoul National Capital Area - Seoul, Incheon, Suwon, Goyang, Yongin, Seongnam, and the rest of Gyeonggi Province: (26,000,000)
 Greater Busan Area - Busan, Ulsan, Changwon, Gimhae, Yangsan, Jinju, (13,000,000)

Taiwan

 West Coast of Taiwan - Taipei, New Taipei City, Keelung, Taoyuan, Hsinchu, Taichung, Changhua, Chiayi, Tainan, and Kaohsiung: (18,000,000)

Middle East

Iran
 Greater Tehran: A region located Tehran and Alborz provinces in central northern Iran with its influence expanding in Mazandaran, Qazvin, and Qom provinces, home for at least 15 million people, it is one of the most populous urban areas in the Greater Middle East and the surrounding regions. Tehran was a small village 200 years ago when it was first chosen as the Capital city and it has been growing at a very fast rate.

Turkey

 Ista-Burs Megalopolis: In addition to the mega cities of Istanbul and Bursa; Gebze, Yalova, Kocaeli, and Adapazarı cities form a contiguous urban area. In 2020, these provinces are home to about 21 million people.

South Asia

India
 Kolkata Megalopolis
 Bangalore Megalopolis
 Hyderabad Megalopolis
 Delhi-NCR Megalopolis, Population 46 million.
 Chennai Megalopolis - Chennai Metropolitan Region, Kanchipuram, Tiruvallur, Chengalpattu and Vellore. Population 20 million.
 Maharashtra - Mumbai Metropolitan Region includes cities of Mumbai, Thane, Navi Mumbai, Kalyan-Dombivali, Vasai-Virar, Panvel and surrounding towns and cities; Pune Metropolitan Region includes cities of Pune, Pimpri-Chinchwad as well as nearby towns and the cities of Nashik, Aurangabad, Ahmednagar and other cities and towns in the region. Population 48 million.
 Karnataka: cities like Bangalore, Mangalore, Mysore, Hubli, Kalaburagi and other cities
 Telengana and Andhra: cities like Visakhapatanam, Warangal, Vijayawada, Tirupati, Guntur and other cities.
 Gujarat - cities of Ahmedabad, Gandhinagar, Anand, Nadiad, Vadodara, Surat, Rajkot and nearby towns and cities. Population 20 million.

Southeast Asia

Philippines 

Mega Manila area 50,525.48 km2 is made up of 4 Regions:

Central Luzon (11,218,117)
Metro Manila (12,877,253) 
Calabarzon (14,414,774) 
Mimaropa excluding Palawan (2,113,891)

Regional centers:

San Fernando-Manila-Calamba-Calapan

Total Population of Mega Manila as of 2015: (40,624,035)

Indonesia 
Jakarta metropolitan area/"Jabodetabek" (31,240,000). The area comprises Jakarta Special Capital Region and surrounding satellite cities, with the name taken from the first two (or three) letters of each city's name: Jakarta, Bogor, Depok, Tangerang and Bekasi.

Thailand 
 Bay of Bangkok Economic Rim: Bangkok–Ayutthaya–Pattaya (16,000,000)

Vietnam 
 Red River Delta (Hanoi, Hai Phong, Nam Định, and Hải Dương) (10,000,000)

Europe 

The Blue Banana, also known as the European Megalopolis or the Liverpool-Milan axis, is a discontinuous corridor of urbanization spreading over Western and Central Europe, with a population of around 111 million.

North America

Canada

Mexico

Note: Tijuana, Mexico is part of the Southern California megalopolis.

United States 

Constituent urban areas of each megalopolis are based on reckoning by a single American organization, the Regional Plan Association (RPA). The RPA definition of the Great Lakes Megalopolis includes some Canadian metropolitan areas with the United States, including some but not all major urban centres in the Windsor-Quebec City Corridor. Note that one city, Houston, is listed in two different Megalopolis regions as defined by the RPA, (the Gulf Coast and the Texas Triangle). 77% of the U.S. population lives in at least one of the megalopolises listed below.

South America

Argentina

Brazil

Colombia
The following megaregions in Colombia are expected to have nearly 93% (55 million people) of its population by 2030, up from the current 72% . There are currently four major megaregions in Colombia.

Other sources show that another megaregion may be considered:

Chile

Peru

Venezuela

Transnational urban agglomeration

Africa 
 Kinshasa–Brazzaville, a transnational megalopolis along the Congo River.
The Abidjan–Lagos Corridor (Abidjan–Sekondi-Takoradi–Kasoa–Accra–Prampram–Lomé–Cotonou–Lagos, spanning the coasts of Ivory Coast, Ghana, Togo, Benin and Nigeria) is expected to become a megalopolis in the 21st century, with a population of 51 million people by 2035.

Asia 
 SIJORI Growth Triangle: Johor Bahru–Singapore–Batam–Bintan (10,000,000)

Europe

North America

In popular culture

Metropolis
Metropolis is a 1927 German expressionist science-fiction drama film directed by Fritz Lang. Written by Thea von Harbou in collaboration with Lang, it stars Gustav Fröhlich, Alfred Abel, Rudolf Klein-Rogge and Brigitte Helm. Erich Pommer produced it in the Babelsberg Studios for Universum Film A.G. (Ufa). The silent film is regarded as a pioneering science-fiction movie, being among the first feature-length movies of that genre. Filming took place over 17 months in 1925–26 at a cost of over five million Reichsmarks.

Judge Dredd
In the Judge Dredd (1977) comic book series and its spinoff series, Mega-City One is a huge fictional megalopolis-size city-state covering much of what is now the Eastern United States and some of Canada. The exact geography of the city depends on which writer and artist has done which story, but from its first appearance it has been associated with New York City's urban sprawl; originally it was presented as a future New York, which was retconned as the centre of a "Mega-City One" in the very next story. The Architects' Journal placed it at No. 1 in their list of "comic book cities".

Blade Runner
Blade Runner is a 1982 neo-noir science fiction film directed by Ridley Scott, written by Hampton Fancher and David Peoples, and starring Harrison Ford, Rutger Hauer, Sean Young, and Edward James Olmos. It is a loose adaptation of Philip K. Dick's novel Do Androids Dream of Electric Sheep? (1968). The film is set in a dystopian future Los Angeles of 2019, in which synthetic humans known as replicants are bio-engineered by the powerful Tyrell Corporation to work on off-world colonies. When a fugitive group of replicants led by Roy Batty (Hauer) escapes back to Earth, burnt-out cop Rick Deckard (Ford) reluctantly agrees to hunt them down.

Sprawl trilogy
In William Gibson's Sprawl trilogy, "the Sprawl" is a colloquial name for the "Boston-Atlanta Metropolitan Axis" (BAMA), an urban sprawl environment on a massive scale, and a fictional extension of the real Northeast megalopolis.  The Sprawl is a visualization of a future where virtually the entire East Coast of the United States, from Boston to Atlanta, has melded into a single mass of urban sprawl. It has been enclosed in several geodesic domes and merged into one megacity. The city has become a separate world with its own climate, no real night/day cycle, and an artificial sky that is always grey.

Further reading
  This work, while dated, is from Associate Planner Yoav Hagler of America 2050, and while not used as a source in this article, is one of the most focused articles available on the American aspects of the title subject. It includes history, methodology, and statistical and other criteria sections, and identifies the U.S. megaregions as of its publication date.

  Starting point for access to articles from the America 2050 effort, while it was active. Note, an earlier cited article by Matt Taylor, on urban transit issues, appears among the works linked at this home page.

See also 

 Arcology
 Conurbation
 Ecumenopolis
 Ekistics
 Settlement types:
 Hamlet
 Village
 Town
 City
 Metropolis
 Classification of inhabited localities in Russia
 Global city
 Merger (politics)
 Transborder agglomeration
 Urban area
 Developed environments:
 Exurban
 Rural
 Suburban
 Urban

References

External links 

 

Human habitats
Urban studies and planning terminology
City